Karina Rodriguez (born August 28, 1985) is a Mexican mixed martial artist currently competing in the flyweight division of Bellator MMA. She is also the former Invicta FC Flyweight Champion.

Background 
Rodriguez was born in Puebla, Mexico. She was an active child and participated in swimming, basketball and volleyball. She started training in jiu-jitsu and boxing prior to transitioning to mixed martial arts in 2012.

Mixed martial arts career

Early career 
Rodriguez fought under Xtreme Kombat, XFC International and Xtreme Fighters Latino in Mexico and amassed a record of 4-2 prior signed by Invicta Fighting Championships.

Invicta Fighting Championships 

Rodriguez made her Invicta debut on March 28, 2018, against Barbara Acioly on July 15, 2017 at Invicta FC 24: Dudieva vs. Borella. She won the fight via technical knock-out in round one.

Her next fight came on December 8, 2017, facing Christine Ferea at Invicta FC 26: Maia vs. Niedzwiedz. She won the fight via unanimous decision.

On March 28, 2018, Rodriguez faced DeAnna Bennett at Mizuki vs. Jandiroba. At weight-in Bennett weighted 1.9 Ibs over the flyweight limit of 126 Ibs and was fined 25% of her fight purse to Rodriguez.  She lost the fight split decision.

Rodríguez faced DeAnna Bennett on March 24, 2018 at Invicta FC 28: Morandin vs. Jandiroba. She lost the fight by split decision. 

Rodríguez faced Milana Dudieva on February 15, 2019 at Invicta FC 34: Porto vs. Gonzalez. She won the bout via split decision.

Rodríguez was supposed to face Vanessa Porto at Invicta FC 38: Murato vs. Ducote on November 1, 2019 for the Invicta FC Flyweight World Championship. However, Rodríguez missed weight by a pound and she was unable to compete for the title and was fined 20% of her purse which went to Porto. She lost the bout via unanimous decision.

Invicta FC flyweight champion
Rodríguez fought for the Invicta FC Flyweight Championship against Daiana Torquato at Invicta 44: Rodríguez vs. Torquato on May 21, 2021. Rodriguez won a unanimous decision to become the organization's first Mexican champion.

Rodríguez was scheduled to make her first title defense against the promotional newcomer Ketlen Souza at Invicta FC 46: Rodríguez vs. Torquato II on March 9, 2022. However, Souza withdrew from the bout four days before the event and was replaced by Daiana Torquato. She won the close bout via split decision.

Bellator MMA 
On July 17, 2022, it was announced that Rodríguez had signed with Bellator.

Championships and accomplishments

Mixed Martial Arts 

 Invicta Fighting Championships
 Invicta FC Flyweight Championship (One time, former)
 One successful title defence
 Fight of the Night (One time)  vs. Daiana Torquato

Mixed martial arts record 

|-
|Win
| align=center| 10–4
| Daiana Torquato
| Decision (split)
| Invicta FC 46: Rodríguez vs. Torquato II
| 
| align=center| 5
| align=center| 5:00
| Kansas City, Kansas, United States
|
|-
| Win
| align=center| 9–4
| Daiana Torquato
| Decision (unanimous)
| Invicta FC on AXS TV: Rodríguez vs. Torquato
| 
| align=center| 5
| align=center| 5:00
| Kansas City, Kansas, United States
|
|-
| Loss
| align=center| 8–4
| Vanessa Porto
| Decision (unanimous)
| Invicta FC 38: Murato vs. Ducote
| 
| align=center| 3
| align=center| 5:00
| Kansas City, Kansas, United States
|
|-
| Win
| align=center|  8–3
| DeAnna Bennett
| Decision (unanimous)
| Invicta FC 35: Bennett vs. Rodriguez II
| 
| align=center| 3
| align=center| 5:00
| Kansas City, Kansas, United States
|Invicta FC Flyweight Tournament Final
|-
| Win
| align=center|  7–3
| Milana Dudieva
| Decision (split)
| Invicta FC 34: Porto vs. Gonzalez
| 
| align=center| 3
| align=center| 5:00
| Kansas City, Missouri, United States
| 
|-
| Loss
| align=center|  6–3
| DeAnna Bennett
| Decision (split)
| Invicta FC 28: Mizuki vs. Jandiroba
| 
| align=center| 3
| align=center| 5:00
| Salt Lake City, Utah, United States
|
|-
| Win
| align=center|6–2
| Christine Ferea
| Decision (unanimous)
| Invicta FC 26: Maia vs. Niedzwiedz
| 
| align=center| 3
| align=center| 5:00
| Kansas City, Missouri, United States
|
|-
| Win
| align=center| 5–2
|Barbara Acioly
| TKO (head kick and punches)
| Invicta FC 24: Dudieva vs. Borella
| 
| align=center| 1
| align=center| 2:14
| Kansas City, Missouri, United States
|
|-
| Win
| align=center| 4–2
| Jaclyn Sanchez
| Submission (punches)
| Xtreme Fighters Latino
| 
| align=center| 2
| align=center| 4:46
| Benito Juarez, Mexico
|
|-
| Loss
| align=center| 3–2
| Poliana Botelho
| KO (spinning back kick to the body)
| XFC International 6
| 
| align=center| 3
| align=center| 2:15
| Sao Paulo, Brazil
|
|-
| Win
| align=center| 3–1
| Vydalia Ramos
| TKO (punches)
| Xtreme Kombat 23
| 
| align=center| 1
| align=center| 1:17
| Naucalpan de Juarez, Mexico
|
|-
| Loss
| align=center| 2–1
| Alexa Grasso
| Decision (unanimous)
| Xtreme Kombat 20
| 
| align=center| 3
| align=center| 3:00
| Cuautitlan Izcalli, Mexico
|
|-
| Win
| align=center| 2–0
| Annely Jimenez Garcia
| Decision (unanimous)
| Xtreme Kombat 20
| 
| align=center| 3
| align=center| 3:00
| Cuautitlan Izcalli, Mexico
|
|-
| Win
| align=center| 1–0
| Gabriela Garcia
| TKO (punches)
| Xtreme Kombat 14
| 
| align=center| 1
| align=center| 1:58
| Mexico City, Mexico
|
|-

See also 
 List of current Bellator MMA fighters

References

External links
 
 Karina Rodríguez at Invicta FC

Living people
1985 births
Mexican female mixed martial artists
Flyweight mixed martial artists
Mixed martial artists utilizing boxing
Mixed martial artists utilizing Brazilian jiu-jitsu
Mexican practitioners of Brazilian jiu-jitsu
Female Brazilian jiu-jitsu practitioners
Sportspeople from Puebla